Line 5 of the Guangzhou Metro runs from Liwan District to Huangpu District. Like lines 4 and 6, it is equipped with linear induction motor technology. Line 5's color is red. On December 31, 2009, Line 5 set a record of 567,000 daily passengers, surpassing the ten year ridership projections in the span of just 4 days after its opening. As of May 2017, Line 5 carries an average of 1.05 million passengers per day and is extremely congested throughout the day, operating at over 100% capacity during rush hours. The opening of Phase I of Line 13 further increased traffic demand on the west end of Line 5 and pushing congestion to over 130% capacity. Prompting the Guangzhou Metro to limit passenger traffic at a number of subway stations on Line 5. In 2018, the busiest section of Line 5 reaches over 50,000 pphpd of traffic volume during peak periods. By 2019, the line was used by 1.18 million passengers each day. In the future Line 13 Phase II will provide relief for Line 5.

Opening timeline

Stations

Future Development 
An eastern extension to Huangpu New Port station is currently under construction with opening scheduled in 2023.

Rolling Stock 
Line 5 uses six car linear motor trains. In 2020, Guangzhou Metro started bidding for 14 additional trains to supplement the fleet in preparation for the east extension.

References

05
Railway lines opened in 2009
Linear motor metros